The Cypriot Super Cup is a Cypriot football trophy, contested in an annual match between the previous season's Cypriot First Division champions, and the Cypriot Cup winners. The match is contested at the beginning of the football season, and is usually played at the GSP Stadium in Nicosia. The most successful team in the competition are Omonia, who have won the trophy on 17 occasions.

The current holders are Apollon Limassol, who defeated Omonia 2–0 in the 2022 match.

History 
The first match was played in 1951, under the name Pakkos Shield (Greek: Ασπίδα Πάκκου). The trophy was not awarded to the winner of the match, but would instead be awarded to the overall most successful team in the competition, after 10 matches. The Shield was finally awarded for the first time in 1967, to Çetinkaya, who were the first club to win the trophy three times. At the time, if the league champions and the Cup winners were the same team, they were automatically named winners of the Shield. 

Due to different circumstances, the competition wasn't held for 10 years, and returned in 1979 under the name Stylianakis Shield, in honor of the former president of the Cyprus Football Association. This name remained for 10 years, after which the Shield was awarded to Omonia, who won the trophy seven times in this time period. 

The competition was renamed as Cyprus Football Association Shield in 1989. From 2008 until 2013, the competition was held under the name LTV Super Cup, for sponsorship reasons. Since LTV's withdrawal as the competition's sponsor in 2014, the competition is simply called the Super Cup.

Rules 
If a team wins the double (the Championship and the Cup in the same season), then this team plays the runners-up of the Cypriot Cup. If no winner is determined after 90 minutes, a penalty shootout takes place.

Cypriot Super Cup Finals
List of finals:

Performances

Performance by club

References

External links
Cyprus - List of Super Cup Finals at RSSSF

Cyprus
2